Jacques Kuoh-Moukouri (1909-2002) was a Cameroonian writer and Cameroon's Ambassador to the United States. He is most well known for his 1963 book Doigts noirs. He was born in the Akwa District of Douala on 6 June 1909 and attended secondary school in Yaoundé at the Ecole SupeVieure. Kuoh-Moukouri became a leading administrator under the French and spent several years working in Paris. He had eight children including the French feminist and author Thérèse Kuoh-Moukouri. He died on 15 May 2002.

References

1909 births
2002 deaths
People from Douala
Cameroonian male writers
Ambassadors of Cameroon to the United States